Juan Cruz Sol Oria (13 September 1947 – 10 November 2020) was a Spanish footballer, who played as a defender.

International career
He played 28 matches for Spain national football team, and scored 1 goal.

International goals

Honours
Valencia
 1 Spanish League: 1970–71
 1 Spanish Cup: 1966–67
 1 UEFA Cup Winners' Cup: 1979–80
 1 UEFA Super Cup: 1980

Real Madrid
 3 Spanish League: 1975–76, 1977–78, 1978–79

Death
Sol died on 10 November 2020 at the age of 73.

References

External links
 
 National team data 
 
 Valencia CF biography 
 

1947 births
2020 deaths
People from Elgoibar
Spanish footballers
Footballers from the Basque Country (autonomous community)
Association football defenders
La Liga players
Valencia CF players
Real Madrid CF players
Spain youth international footballers
Spain under-23 international footballers
Spain international footballers